The men's vault competition was one of eight events for male competitors of the artistic gymnastics discipline contested in the gymnastics at the 2004 Summer Olympics in Athens. The qualification and final rounds took place on August 14 and August 23 at the Olympic Indoor Hall. There were 79 competitors from 30 nations, with nations competing in the team event having up to 5 gymnasts and other nations having up to 2 gymnasts. The event was won by Gervasio Deferr of Spain, the third man to successfully defend an Olympic title in the vault and sixth man to win multiple medals of any color. Latvia and Romania each earned their first men's vault medals, with Evgeni Sapronenko's silver and Marian Drăgulescu's bronze, respectively.

Background

This was the 21st appearance of the event, which is one of the five apparatus events held every time there were apparatus events at the Summer Olympics (no apparatus events were held in 1900, 1908, 1912, or 1920). Four of the eight finalists from 2000 returned: gold medalist Gervasio Deferr of Spain, silver medalist Alexei Bondarenko of Russia, fourth-place finisher Alexei Nemov of Russia, and sixth-place finisher Blaine Wilson of the United States. Li Xiaopeng of China had won the last two world championships in 2002 and 2003 (as well as his 1999 title), with Marian Drăgulescu of Romania the 2001 champion and 2003 runner-up. Deferr, the defending gold medalist, had had little success since his Sydney victory.

Colombia, Malaysia, and Tunisia each made their debut in the men's vault. The United States made its 19th appearance, most of any nation; the Americans had missed only the inaugural 1896 vault and the boycotted 1980 Games.

Competition format

The 1996 gymnastics competition had introduced the "7–6–5" format, in which each team had 7 members, designated 6 for each apparatus, and had 5 count for team scores. In 2000, this was reduced across the board to a "6–5–4" format; the 2004 competition kept this format. Further, while in 1996 all 7 team members could compete on each apparatus for individual purposes, in 2000 and 2004 only the 5 designated for that apparatus competed. The 2000 competition had also eliminated the compulsory exercises; only voluntary exercises were done on each apparatus. The qualifying round scores were used for qualification for the team all-around, individual all-around, and apparatus finals.

The top eight gymnasts, with a limit of two per nation, advanced to the final. Non-finalists were ranked 9th through 79th based on preliminary score. The preliminary score had no effect on the final; once the eight finalists were selected, their ranking depended only on the final exercise. On vault, the final consisted of two attempts per gymnast, with the average score of the two counting.

Schedule

All times are Greece Standard Time (UTC+2)

Results

Qualifying

Seventy-nine gymnasts competed in the vault event in the artistic gymnastics qualification round on August 14. The eight highest scoring gymnasts, with a maximum of two per nation, advanced to the final on August 23.

Final

References

Gymnastics Results.com

Men's vault
2004
Men's 2004
Men's events at the 2004 Summer Olympics